Jalen Moore (born August 7, 1999) is an American college basketball player for the Oakland Golden Grizzlies of the Horizon League. He previously played for Olney Central Blue Knights.

High school career
Moore attended Cloverdale High School in Cloverdale, Indiana. As a senior, he averaged 36.8 points per game and scored 1,033 points, the third-most in a single season in state history. His 2,440 career points ranked 11th in state history.

College career
Moore began playing college basketball at Olney Central College. He averaged 19.3 points and 7.8 assists per game as a freshman. In his sophomore season, he averaged 22.6 points, 6.2 assists and five rebounds per game. He was a Third Team National Junior College Athletic Association Division I All-American and an All-Great Rivers Athletic Conference selection.

For his junior season, Moore moved to the NCAA Division I, transferring to Oakland. He was drawn there in part due the success Kay Felder, another undersized point guard, had with the program. On January 8, 2021, Moore scored 33 points in an 84–81 loss to Green Bay in overtime. On January 16, he posted 31 points and 12 assists in an 81–74 win over Youngstown State. Six days later, Moore recorded 18 points, 14 assists and 11 rebounds in an 86–81 victory over Detroit Mercy, the first triple-double by an Oakland player since Felder in 2016. He averaged 17.9 points, a Division I-leading 8.4 assists and 4.1 rebounds per game. Moore was named to the First Team All-Horizon League. He was named to the Second Team All-Horizon League as a senior.

Career statistics

College

NCAA Division I

|-
| style="text-align:left;"| 2020–21
| style="text-align:left;"| Oakland
| 30 || 29 || 37.8 || .383 || .349 || .776 || 4.1 || style="background:#cfecec;" | 8.4* || 1.7 || .1 || 17.9

Personal life
Moore's father, William, played college basketball for Daytona State College and Murray State before embarking on a professional career.

References

External links
Oakland Golden Grizzlies bio
Olney Central Blue Knights bio

1999 births
Living people
American men's basketball players
Basketball players from Indiana
Junior college men's basketball players in the United States
Oakland Golden Grizzlies men's basketball players
Point guards